Meerschaert is a surname of Belgian origin. Notable people with the surname include:

Gerald Meerschaert (born 1987), American mixed martial artist
Theophile Meerschaert (1847-1924), Belgian-born Roman Catholic bishop

Surnames of Belgian origin